Christen Renee Drew (born February 7, 1987) is a former news reporter, television producer, assignment editor and anchor for the ABC affiliate WSIL channel 3 in Carterville, Illinois. Drew earned a bachelor's degree in radio television mass communication from Southern Illinois University Carbondale. She was awarded the Ben Gelman Award for News Excellence in 2005. While attending Southern Illinois University, Craig worked as an anchor, reporter and executive producer for River Region Evening Edition on WSIU-TV, the university-owned news station. In 2008 Drew was named SIU news student of the year. She earned the 2008 Medium Illinois Market Silverdome award for best TV Reporter. In fall of 2008, she won an Illinois Associated Press award for Best Hard News Story documenting an incident of elder scam.

References

American women journalists
1987 births
Living people
Southern Illinois University Carbondale alumni
People from McLeansboro, Illinois
Journalists from Illinois
21st-century American women